Jorge José Benítez (born 3 June 1950 in Gobernador Castro, Buenos Aires Province) is an Argentine former football player and coach.

Nicknamed El Chino ("The Chinese"), Benítez started his career in Racing Club in 1969; in 1973 he was transferred to Boca Juniors, where he stayed until retirement in 1983. A gifted midfielder, he played 305 league matches and scored 40 goals for Boca, being instrumental in achieving the Metropolitano title in 1976 and 1981, the Nacional in 1976, the Copa Libertadores in 1977 and 1978 and the European/South American Cup in 1977.

Since he shared Boca's midfield with talented players such as Trobbiani, Suñé, Potente, Ribolzi, Berta, Zanabria, Brindisi, and Maradona, his place in the team was often compromised.

After retirement, Benítez worked as junior division coach in Boca Juniors, and was offered the post of main coach in November 2004 upon the resignation of (former teammate) Brindisi due to poor results.

Benítez's first achievement was to stabilize the team's performance, and indeed it went on to win the Copa Sudamericana 2004; management was convinced that he was the right man for the job, and extended the term of his contract, instead of going for a big-name coach.

On 15 July 2005, Benítez was sacked from Boca Juniors, following a poor performance by the team in the Copa Libertadores, and an incident in the quarterfinals match against Chivas de Guadalajara. A review of tape showed the manager spitting at Chivas player Adolfo Bautista. After being sacked, Benítez sought out Bautista to personally apologize by flying to a Chivas practice at Guadalajara. The apology was accepted but a personal meeting was rejected. Boca then proceeded to hire former national team coach Alfio Basile for the post.

References

External links
 Statistics and profile at Historia de Boca

1950 births
Living people
Sportspeople from Buenos Aires Province
Argentine footballers
Argentina international footballers
Argentine football managers
Argentine Primera División players
Racing Club de Avellaneda footballers
Boca Juniors footballers
Boca Juniors managers
Association football midfielders
S.D. Quito managers